ACS International Schools is a group of four independent schools catering for local and international families - three in England and one in Qatar. Until 2005, the organisation was known as American Community Schools. The four campuses are in Cobham and Egham in Surrey, the London Borough of Hillingdon, and the city of Doha in Qatar, the latter of which opened in September 2011. Full boarding fees including tuition are from £45,060 per year for children aged 12–14 years.

The head office is in Heywood House in Cobham.

Campuses

ACS Cobham 
Situated in Surrey, 15 miles from Central London, ACS Cobham is on a 128-acre campus and offers the International Baccalaureate Diploma and an American curriculum including the Advanced Placement courses. Accommodating both day and boarding requirements, ACS Cobham is home to 1,500 students from over 60 countries. A new senior boarding house, for students aged 16–18, opened in 2017, providing accommodation for 113 students, with separate areas for boys and girls. Grade 11 students share twin ensuite rooms, while every Grade 12 student has their own single ensuite room with study area. Fields is the junior boarding house for students 12–16 years old. It had a refurbishment in 2018, providing accommodation for over 110 students. Students who board represent more than 30 countries.

The sports team is called Cougars. The sports facilities at ACS Cobham include soccer and rugby fields, softball and baseball diamonds, an all-weather track, tennis courts, and a six-hole golf course. They were used by FC Barcelona for a youth academy in 2011. Due to ACS Cobham's close proximity to Chelsea F.C.'s training ground, it was subject to media attention when Brendan Rodgers was noticed there in 2015.

ACS Egham
Opened in 1995, ACS Egham is located on a  campus, in Surrey, opposite Windsor Great Park. This campus specialises in the International Baccalaureate and is a day school. It is the only school in the UK (as of 02/02/2020) authorised to offer all four International Baccalaureate (IB) programmes - Primary Years, Middle Years, Career-related, and Diploma. 25 miles from London, they are home to 600 students, aged 4 to 18, and 160 faculty and staff, from around the world. The fees start from £11,090 a year for children 4–5 years old.

ACS Hillingdon
The fees start from £10,850 a year for children aged 4–5 years. Its Lower School is an Apple Distinguished School. The school offers IB Film studies and Visual Arts and Japanese Literature. Their facilities include a Science Centre with seven laboratories. The nearest Underground stations are Uxbridge and Hillingdon. The school is centred on Hillingdon Court, purchased by the organisation in 1978. New buildings adjoining the mansion were built in 1986 incorporating a gymnasium and cafeteria; a wing was built in 1997. ACS Hillingdon rests on an 11-acre campus that encompasses libraries, science and IT labs, art studios, cafeteria, gym, auditorium, and a music centre called the Harmony House. ACS Hillingdon offers a range of academic curriculum. Their academic program offers courses that satisfy the requirements needed for the International Baccalaureate Program, Advanced Placement (AP) courses, US High School Diploma, and Honors program.

ACS Doha
The original ACS Doha campus opened in September 2011, which was located in Al-Garrafah, Qatar, initially enrolling students from 3 to 18 years old. In September 2020, a new campus in Al Kheesa was opened designed to accommodate 2,200 students.

Notable alumni

 Ugo Brachetti Peretti (1983) – Italian nobility, and chairman of oil company Anonima Petroli Italiana
 Aaron Eckhart (1986) – actor
 Alex Corbisiero (2005) – rugby player
 Arkadiy Abramovich –  founder of ARA Capital
 Christian Bakkerud (2003) – GP2 and Le Mans race car driver
 David Menkin (1996) – actor
 David Olshanetsky - writer
 Dave Weigel (2001) – writer
 Frank Simek (2003) – United States national soccer team player
 Joshua Sales (2000) – Musician
 Max Ehmer (2010) – footballer for QPR
 Misha Nonoo (2003) – Fashion designer and matchmaker to Prince Harry and Meghan Markle
 Nick Gindre (2003) – footballer in South African Premier Soccer League
 Omar Fayed – CEO of ESTEE, environmentalist and director of Hôtel Ritz Paris
Ankit Love (2002) – 2016 Mayor of London candidate and leader of Jammu and Kashmir National Panthers Party

References 
Citations

Bibliography
 Pearce, Ken. (2007) Hillingdon Village. Stroud: Sutton Publishing

External links

 

1967 establishments in England
American international schools in Qatar
American international schools in the United Kingdom
Co-educational boarding schools
Private co-educational schools in London
Private school organisations in England
Private schools in London
Private schools in Surrey
Private schools in the London Borough of Hillingdon
International Baccalaureate schools in England
International schools in London
Schools in Doha
Schools in Qatar